Buzby was a yellow (later orange) talking cartoon bird, launched in 1976 as part of a marketing campaign by Post Office Telecommunications, which later became British Telecommunications (BT).

Overview
Buzby appeared in a series of television commercials with the catchphrase: "Make someone happy with a phone call". Buzby's voice was provided by Bernard Cribbins, and the character was animated by Charlie Jenkins of Trickfilm Studios, London.

The campaign spawned many marketing items, such as toys, badges, a comic strip in TV Comic, and books, and lasted until well into the 1980s. British Telecom produced and sold a "Buzby" wrist watch with Buzby perched on the second hand; the watch had a blue strap.

References

BT Group
Advertising characters
Male characters in advertising
Fictional birds
Mascots introduced in 1976